Ayneh Bazar-e Mahtab (also Romanized as Ayneh Bāzār-e Mahtāb; also known as Aeenehbāzār-e Mahtāb) is a village in Tayebi-ye Sarhadi-ye Sharqi Rural District, Charusa District, Kohgiluyeh County, Kohgiluyeh and Boyer-Ahmad Province, Iran. At the 2006 census, its population was 56, in 9 families.

References 

Populated places in Kohgiluyeh County